The 2001 NBA All-Star Game was an exhibition basketball game which was played on February 11, 2001 at the MCI Center in Washington, D.C., home of the Washington Wizards. This game was the 50th edition of the North American National Basketball Association (NBA) All-Star Game and was played during the 2000–01 NBA season.

Allen Iverson was named the game's Most Valuable Player after he rallied the East to garner an improbable 111–110 comeback victory over the West. The East trailed 95–74 with nine minutes left after the West dominated the first 39 minutes behind its superior size. Iverson sparked the comeback scoring 15 of his 25 points in the final nine minutes of the game. Stephon Marbury also helped the East by hitting two three-pointers in the final 53 seconds, including one with 28 seconds left, which proved to be the game-winner.

Kobe Bryant scored the most points for the West squad (19 points), which led by as much as twenty-one points before the team squandered the lead. Bryant, the NBA's leading scorer at the time, could have taken the last shot; instead, he threw a pass that resulted in a last-second miss by Tim Duncan.

All-Star Game

Coaches

The coach for the Western Conference team was Sacramento Kings head coach Rick Adelman. The Kings had a 31-15 record on February 11. The coach for the Eastern Conference team was Philadelphia 76ers head coach Larry Brown. The 76ers had a 36-14 record on February 11.

Players

The rosters for the All-Star Game were chosen in two ways. The starters were chosen via a fan ballot. Two guards, two forwards and one center who received the highest vote were named the All-Star starters. The reserves were chosen by votes among the NBA head coaches in their respective conferences. The coaches were not permitted to vote for their own players. The reserves consist of two guards, two forwards, one center and two players regardless of position. If a player is unable to participate due to injury, the commissioner will select a replacement.

For the second consecutive year, Vince Carter of the Toronto Raptors was the lead vote-getter with 1,717,687. He was closely followed by Allen Iverson, who earned his second consecutive All-Star appearances. Tracy McGrady, Grant Hill, and Alonzo Mourning completed the Eastern Conference starting position. This was the first All-Star appearance by McGrady. Iverson, Hill, and Mourning were all starters the previous year. The Eastern Conference reserves included two first-time selections, Theo Ratliff and Stephon Marbury. The other reserves were Dikembe Mutombo, Ray Allen, Allan Houston, Glenn Robinson, Latrell Sprewell, and Jerry Stackhouse. Because of injuries to Mourning and Hill, Antonio Davis and Anthony Mason were selected as replacements.

The Western Conference's leading vote-getter was Shaquille O'Neal, who earned his eight consecutive All-Star Game selection with 1,541,298 votes. Jason Kidd, Kobe Bryant, Chris Webber, and Tim Duncan completed the Western Conference starting positions. Kidd, Bryant, Duncan, and O'Neal were starters for the previous year's Western Conference team, while Webber was a reserve. The Western Conference reserves include two first-time selections, Vlade Divac and Antonio McDyess. The team was rounded out by Gary Payton, Michael Finley, Rasheed Wallace, Karl Malone, and David Robinson. Because of an injury to O'Neal, Kevin Garnett, who had started the previous year, was selected as his replacement.

Roster

 Grant Hill, Alonzo Mourning, Theo Ratliff, and Shaquille O'Neal were unable to participate due to injury.
 Lattrell Sprewell, Dikembe Mutombo, Antonio Davis, and Vlade Divac were named as Hill, Mourning, Ratliff, and O'Neal's replacements respectively.
 Anthony Mason, Davis, and Kevin Garnett were named as starters, replacing Hill, Mourning, and O'Neal respectively.

Game

All-Star Weekend

Rising Stars Challenge

The Rising Stars Challenge featured the best first-year players ('Rookies') against the best second-year players ('Sophomores'). Kevin Loughery and Elvin Hayes served as head coaches for the rookies and sophomores respectively.

Slam Dunk Contest

Three-Point Contest

References

National Basketball Association All-Star Game
All-Star
Basketball competitions in Washington, D.C.
2001 in sports in Washington, D.C.